The Vagrants is the first novel by Yiyun Li. It was published in 2009, following her award-winning 2005 short story collection A Thousand Years of Good Prayers.

The novel won Li the 2009 gold medal of California Book Award for fiction.

In his review, in The New York Times, Pico Iyer characterizes her novel as an instance of "American stories that are World stories".

References

2009 American novels
2009 debut novels
Random House books